David Bertram Cropp (July 8, 1876 – ?) was an American football and baseball coach. He served as the head football coach at the University of Colorado at Boulder in 1903 and 1904, compiling a record of 14–4–1. Cropp was also the head baseball coach at Colorado in 1904 and 1905, tallying a mark of 9–9. He attended Lenox College and the University of Wisconsin–Madison.

Head coaching record

Football

References

1876 births
Year of death missing
Colorado Buffaloes baseball coaches
Colorado Buffaloes football coaches
University of Wisconsin–Madison alumni
People from Dubuque County, Iowa
Coaches of American football from Iowa